Ordgarius is a genus of orb-weaver spiders first described by Eugen von Keyserling in 1886. Adult females of the genus are bolas spiders, capturing their prey with one or more sticky drops at the end of a single line of silk rather than in a web. Males and juvenile females capture their prey directly with their legs.

Species
 it contains twelve species:
Ordgarius acanthonotus (Simon, 1909) – Vietnam
Ordgarius bicolor Pocock, 1899 – Papua New Guinea (New Britain)
Ordgarius clypeatus Simon, 1897 – Indonesia (Ambon)
Ordgarius ephippiatus Thorell, 1898 – Myanmar
Ordgarius furcatus (O. Pickard-Cambridge, 1877) – Australia (New South Wales)
Ordgarius f. distinctus (Rainbow, 1900) – Australia (New South Wales)
Ordgarius hexaspinus Saha & Raychaudhuri, 2004 – India
Ordgarius hobsoni (O. Pickard-Cambridge, 1877) – India, Sri Lanka, China, Japan
Ordgarius magnificus (Rainbow, 1897) – Australia (Queensland, New South Wales)
Ordgarius monstrosus Keyserling, 1886 – Australia (Queensland)
Ordgarius pustulosus Thorell, 1897 – Indonesia (Java)
Ordgarius sexspinosus (Thorell, 1894) – India to Japan, Indonesia

References

Araneidae
Araneomorphae genera
Spiders of Asia
Spiders of Australia
Taxa named by Eugen von Keyserling